Jumpin' at the Woodside, subtitled A Buck Clayton Jam Session, is an album by trumpeter Buck Clayton which was recorded between 1953 and 1956 and released on the Columbia label.

Reception

The Allmusic review by Scott Yanow stated "The music is taken from three different sessions, with this version of "Jumpin' at the Woodside" splicing together the best of two completely different performances. The lineup of top players gives one a good idea as to the high quality of the music".

Track listing 
 "Rock-a-Bye Basie" (Count Basie, Lester Young, Shad Collins) – 8:10
 "Jumpin' at the Woodside" (Basie) – 10:40
 "Blue and Sentimental" (Basie, Jerry Livingston, Mack David) – 6:30
 "Broadway" (Billy Byrd, Teddy McRae, Henri Woode) – 9:25
Recorded in NYC on March 31, 1954 (track 2), August 13, 1954 (tracks 2 & 3) and March 15, 1955 (tracks 1 & 4)

Personnel 
Buck Clayton – trumpet
Joe Newman (tracks 2 & 3), Joe Thomas (track 2) – trumpet
Ruby Braff – cornet (tracks 1 & 4)
Bennie Green (tracks 1 & 4), Urbie Green (tracks 2 & 3), Dicky Harris (tracks 1 & 4), Trummy Young (track 2) – trombone
Woody Herman – clarinet (track 2)
Lem Davis – alto saxophone (tracks 2 & 3)
Al Cohn (track 2), Julian Dash (track 2), Coleman Hawkins (tracks 1–4), Buddy Tate (tracks 1 & 4) – tenor saxophone
Charles Fowlkes – baritone saxophone (tracks 2 & 3)
Jimmy Jones (track 2), Billy Kyle (tracks 2 & 3) – piano, celeste 
Al Waslohn – piano (tracks 1 & 4)
Steve Jordan (tracks 1, 2 & 4), Freddie Green (tracks 2 & 3) – guitar
Milt Hinton (tracks 1–4), Walter Page (track 2) – bass 
Jo Jones – drums
Jack Ackerman – tap dancing (track 1)

References 

1955 albums
Buck Clayton albums
Columbia Records albums